The 2015 Havant Borough Council election took place on 7 May 2015 to elect members of the Havant Borough Council in England. It was held on the same day as other local elections.

After the election, the composition of the council was:

 Conservative: 31
 Labour: 4
 UKIP: 2
 Liberal Democrats: 1

Election result 
With 51% of the vote, the Conservatives won all seats up for election this year, which all had incumbent Conservative councillors. As such, the composition of the council did not change in the course of the election.

Ward results

Bedhampton

Cowplain

Emsworth

Hart Plain

Hayling East

Hayling West

Purbrook

St Faith's

Stakes

Waterloo

References

2015 English local elections
May 2015 events in the United Kingdom
2015
2010s in Hampshire